Auliepterix is an extinct genus of small primitive metallic moths within the family Micropterigidae. The genus is represented by two species, Auliepterix mirabilis in the Karabastau Svita of the Upper Jurassic of Kazakhstan (near Aulye) and Auliepterix minima in Upper Jurassic-Lower Cretaceous rocks near Khotont Somon in the Mongolian People's Republic.

References 

†
Fossil Lepidoptera
Late Jurassic insects
Fossils of Kazakhstan
†